Bruno Nhavene (born February 21, 2002) is a Mozambican junior tennis player.

Nhavene has a career high ATP doubles ranking of 1418 achieved on 2 December 2019. Nhavene has a career high ITF juniors ranking of 168 achieved on 9 March 2020.

Nhavene has represented Mozambique at Davis Cup, where he has a win-loss record of 10–8. Nhavene made his Davis Cup debut for Mozambique in 2018, while the team was competing in the Africa Zone Group III, when he was 16 years and 118 days old.

Future and Challenger finals

Doubles: 1 (0–1)

Davis Cup

Participations: (10–8)

   indicates the outcome of the Davis Cup match followed by the score, date, place of event, the zonal classification and its phase, and the court surface.

References

External links

2002 births
Living people
Mozambican male tennis players